Stéphane Bonsergent (born September 3, 1977) is a French former professional racing cyclist, who competed as a professional with the  team, between 2006 and 2011.

Major results

2002
 4th Boucle de l'Artois
 5th Grand Prix de la Ville de Nogent-sur-Oise
2004
 1st Univest Grand Prix
 7th Grand Prix de Beuvry-la-Forêt
2005
 1st Stage 4 Boucles de la Mayenne
 3rd Grand Prix de Beuvry-la-Forêt
 5th Overall Tour de Normandie
1st Stage 1 
 6th Overall Ruban Granitier Breton
1st Stage 4
2006
 1st Circuit de la Nive
 1st Stages 4 & 9 Tour du Faso
 5th GP de Dourges-Hénin-Beaumont
 6th Tro-Bro Léon
 8th Paris–Troyes
 10th Tour de Vendée
2007
 1st Ronde du Pays Basque
 4th Tro-Bro Léon
 6th Paris–Bourges
 6th Châteauroux Classic
 6th GP de la Ville de Rennes
2008
 9th Overall La Tropicale Amissa Bongo
1st Mountains classification
1st Stage 2
 9th Cholet-Pays de Loire
 10th Paris–Troyes
2009
 2nd Tro-Bro Léon
 5th GP de Denain
 6th Châteauroux Classic
 7th GP de Fourmies
 9th Grand Prix de la Ville de Lillers
2011
 4th Grand Prix de la Ville de Lillers

References

External links

1977 births
Living people
French male cyclists
Sportspeople from Maine-et-Loire
Cyclists from Pays de la Loire